Ruth Lilian Brekke (born 25 August 1938) is a Norwegian politician for the Conservative Party,

She served as a deputy representative to the Norwegian Parliament from Akershus during the term 2001–2005.

On the local level Brekke was the mayor of Frogn until 2003.

References

1938 births
Living people
Deputy members of the Storting
Conservative Party (Norway) politicians
Mayors of places in Akershus
Women mayors of places in Norway
20th-century Norwegian women politicians
20th-century Norwegian politicians
Women members of the Storting